Julius Mikael Tauriainen (born 18 April 2001) is a Finnish professional footballer who plays as a defender for Veikkausliiga club FC Lahti. and the Finland U21. He is the older brother of Chelsea forward Jimi Tauriainen, and the son of former Finland international footballer Pasi Tauriainen.

Club career

Klubi 04

On 18 February 2018 it was reported that HJK had signed a 2+1 year contract with its own protégé Julius Tauriainen.

SC Freiburg II

On 2 July 2020 HJK announced that it had accepted SC Freiburgs offer for a permanent transfer of Tauriainen.

Miedź Legnica II

Miedź Legnica announced on 15 September 2022 that Tauriainen had joined the club and that he would represent Miedź Legnica II.

International career
He has represented Finland at international youth levels and was in the starting eleven in 8 out of 10 2023 UEFA European Under-21 Championship qualification matches.

Career statistics

Club

Notes

References

External links

 Julius Tauriainen – SPL competition record  

2001 births
Living people
Finnish footballers
Association football midfielders
Finland youth international footballers
Finland under-21 international footballers
Kakkonen players
Regionalliga players
3. Liga players
Klubi 04 players
Helsingin Jalkapalloklubi players
SC Freiburg players
SC Freiburg II players
Kuopion Palloseura players
Miedź Legnica players
Finnish expatriate footballers
Finnish expatriate sportspeople in Germany
Expatriate footballers in Germany
Finnish expatriate sportspeople in Poland
Expatriate footballers in Poland